Thomas Edwin "Tom" Ricks (born September 25, 1955) is an American journalist and author who specializes in the military and national security issues.  He is a two-time winner of the Pulitzer Prize for National Reporting as part of teams from the Wall Street Journal (2000) and Washington Post (2002). He has reported on military activities in Somalia, Haiti, Korea, Bosnia, Kosovo, Macedonia, Kuwait, Turkey, Afghanistan, and Iraq. He previously wrote a blog for Foreign Policy and is a member of the Center for a New American Security, a defense policy think tank.

Ricks lectures widely to the military and is a member of Harvard University's Senior Advisory Council on the Project on U.S. Civil-Military Relations. Ricks is the author of several nonfiction books including Making the Corps (1997); the bestselling Fiasco: The American Military Adventure in Iraq (2006) and its follow-up, The Gamble: General David Petraeus and the American Military Adventure in Iraq, 2006–2008 (2009); the bestselling First Principles: What America's Founders Learned from the Greeks and Romans and How That Shaped Our Country (2020); and Waging a Good War: A Military History of the Civil Rights Movement, 1954-1968 (2022).

Life and career
Ricks was born in Beverly, Massachusetts, and grew up in New York and Afghanistan, one of six children. He is the son of Anne and David Frank Ricks, a professor of psychology. He attended the American International School in Kabul (1968–1970), including his freshman year of high school.  He graduated from Scarsdale High School (1973).

After earning a B.A. from Yale University (1977), he was an instructor at Lingnan College, Hong Kong (1977–1979), and assistant editor at the Wilson Quarterly (1979–1981). At the Wall Street Journal he was a reporter (1982–1985) and deputy Miami bureau chief (1986).  In Washington, D.C.,  he was a Journal reporter (1987–1989), feature editor (1989–1992), and Pentagon correspondent, (1992–1999).  He was a military correspondent at the Washington Post (2000–2008).

While at the Wall Street Journal, he was one of the reporters writing the "Price of Power" series discussing United States defense spending and potential changes confronting the US military following the Cold War.  The series won the Journal the 2000 Pulitzer Prize for National Reporting. He won a second Pulitzer Prize for National Reporting as part of The Washington Post team for reporting about the beginnings of the U.S. counteroffensive against terrorism.

Ricks was a finalist for the 2007 Pulitzer Prize for General Non-Fiction for his book Fiasco: The American Military Adventure in Iraq.

Ricks was immensely critical of Fox News' coverage of the 2012 Benghazi attack. While being interviewed by Jon Scott, Ricks accused Fox News of being "extremely political" in its coverage of the attack and stated, "Fox was operating as a wing of the Republican Party."

Books

Nonfiction 

 Making the Corps. Scribner, 1997. ISBN 0684848171
 Fiasco: The American Military Adventure in Iraq. Penguin Group, 2006. 
 The Gamble: General David Petraeus and the American Military Adventure in Iraq, 2006–2008. The Penguin Press, 2009. ISBN 	978-1-59420-197-4
 The Generals: American Military Command from World War II to Today. Penguin Press, 2012. ISBN 978-1-59420-404-3
 Churchill & Orwell: The Fight for Freedom. Penguin Press, 2017. ISBN 978-1-59420-613-9
 First Principles: What America's Founders Learned from the Greeks and Romans and How That Shaped Our Country. Harper, 2020. ISBN 978-0-06-299745-6
 Waging a Good War: A Military History of the Civil Rights Movement, 1954-1968. Farrar, Straus and Giroux, 2022. ISBN 978-0-374-60516-2

Fiction 

 A Soldier's Duty. Random House, 2001. ISBN 978-0-375-50544-7

References

External links

 Foreign Policy bio
  Ricks discusses Fiasco: The American Military Adventure in Iraq at the Pritzker Military Museum & Library on October 5, 2006 
  Ricks discusses The Gamble: General David Petraeus & the American Military Adventure in Iraq, 2006-2008 at the Pritzker Military Museum & Library on September 10, 2009 
 

1955 births
Living people
American foreign policy writers
American male non-fiction writers
The Atlantic (magazine) people
Historians of the Iraq War
People from Beverly, Massachusetts
People from Scarsdale, New York
Scarsdale High School alumni
The Wall Street Journal people
The Washington Post people
Writers from Massachusetts
Writers from New York (state)
Yale University alumni
Harvard Kennedy School people
Historians of the civil rights movement